NA-143 (Okara-I) was a constituency for the National Assembly of Pakistan comprising mainly Gogera. After the 2018 delimitations it was abolished, and its areas were included in the constituency of NA-141 (Okara-I).

Election 2002 

General elections were held on 10 Oct 2002. Rai Muhammad Aslam Kharal of PML-Q won by 50,106 votes.

Election 2008 

General elections were held on 18 Feb 2008. Captain(R) Rai Ghulam Mujataba of PPP won by 63,960 votes. 
Second highest vote were polled in favor of mr. Muhammad Aslam Khan Kharral	of Pakistan Muslim League. He got 43798 votes.

Election 2013 

General elections were held on 11 May 2013. Chaudhary Nadeem Abbas of PML-N won by 90,652 votes and became the  member of National Assembly.

References 

Abolished National Assembly Constituencies of Pakistan